William Francis Garton (born 15 March 1965) is a former footballer who played in the Football League for Manchester United and Birmingham City. He made his United debut in 1984 and played 51 games, the first half of his career marred by an injury, and was forced to retire from full-time football after being diagnosed with chronic fatigue syndrome. He later played for local clubs and taught, emigrating to San Diego, California in 2001 and co-founded the Carmel Valley Manchester youth soccer club.

References

Further reading

External links
 Detailed profile at Sons of United

1965 births
Living people
Footballers from Salford
English footballers
Association football defenders
Manchester United F.C. players
Birmingham City F.C. players
Hyde United F.C. players
Salford City F.C. players
Witton Albion F.C. players
English Football League players
National League (English football) players
English football managers
Salford City F.C. managers
People with chronic fatigue syndrome